The 2018 German Athletics Championships was the 118th edition of the national championship in outdoor track and field for Germany. It was held on 21 and 22 July at the Max-Morlock-Stadion in Nuremberg. It served as the selection meeting for Germany at the 2018 European Athletics Championships.

Championships
The annual national championships in Germany comprised the following competitions:

Cross country running: Ohrdruf, March 10
100 km: Rheine, March 10
Half marathon: Hanover, April 8
20 km road walk: Naumburg, April 14
Marathon: as part of the Düsseldorf Marathon on April 29
10,000 m: Pliezhausen, 12 May
Relays: Rostock, July 29 (held alongside the German Youth Championships)=
Combined events: Wesel, 25/26 August 
Mountain running: Ilsenburg, 1 September
10K run: Bremen, 2 September
50 km road walk: Aschersleben, October 14

A road walking championship was scheduled for 3 June but was cancelled due to the lack of a host.

Results

Men

Women

References

External links 
 Official website of the Deutscher Leichtathletik-Verband (DLV; German Athletics Association) 

2018
Athletics Championships
German Championships
Athletics Championships
Sports competitions in Nuremberg